The Khao Kho National park is located in Lom Kao, Lom Sak, Khao Kho and Mueang Phetchabun districts in Thailand's Phetchabun province.

Topography
The national park is named after Khao Kho, a mesa high . This part of the Phetchabun mountain range is the origin of the main tributaries of the Pa Sak, Yom and Nan rivers.

Climate
Weather measurement station at the Khao Kho National park collects data of temperature, relative humidity and rainfall since June 1999. The park is generally cool all year round, with rainy season around mid-May to October. Rainfall is approximately /year, with rainfall for 126 days a year.  Winter is around November to mid-February. Summer is around mid-February to mid-May.

History
From 1968 to 1981 the park's forest was used as a base for guerrillas of the Communist Party of Thailand. A survey was set up of Khok Sam Sang forest, Khao Polok Lon forest, Khao Pang Kho forest and Wang Chompu forest in the area of Lom Kao district, Lom Sak district, Khao Kho district and Mueang Phetchabun district of Phetchabun province on 16 August 2001. Later on 18 May 2012 Khao Kho National Park, with an area of 301,698 rai ~  and neighbouring Phu Hin Rong Kla National Park to the north,  has been declared the 125th national park and is managed by Protected Areas Regional Office 11 (Phitsanulok).

Flora
The park is home to deciduous dipterocarp forest or red rainforest, such as:

Fauna

Mammel sorts include:

Birds,the park has some 80 species, of which 60 species of passerine from 20 families, represented by one species:

and some 20 species of non-passerine from 9 families, represented by one species:

Reptile sorts include:
Bengal monitor
Butterflies, there is a wide variety of butterflies.

Places
 Namtok Tat Fa - largest waterfall in Khao Kho national park.
 Namtok Khan Bandai - a 20-tiered waterfall.
 Namtok Pha Lat - a waterfall off a cliff.
 Namtok Kaeng Liang Pha - waterfall with a large stone yard.
 Tham Yai Nam Ko - a cave.
 Khao Kho royal palace - temporarily residence from late King Bhumidol Adulyadaj (1985).
 Wat Phra That Pha Son Kaeo - temple with five large sitting Buddha images in line (2004).

Location

See also
 List of national parks in Thailand
 List of Protected Areas Regional Offices of Thailand

References

National parks of Thailand
Ministry of Natural Resources and Environment (Thailand)
Phetchabun Mountains
Phetchabun province
Tourist attractions in Phetchabun province